Bruno Ricardo Rocha da Luz (born 8 December 1988 in Portugal) is a Portuguese footballer.

Career

After failing to make an appearance with English second division club Queen's Park Rangers, Luz almost signed with Portsmouth but the transfer never happened to due Portsmouth being banned. From Queen's Park Rangers, he signed for Apollon Limassol in Cyprus, before being sent on loan to Ermis Aradippou as well as PAEEK. 

In 2013, he returned to Portugal with Associação Naval 1º de Maio but was unable to play for 5 months because of problems with the Cyprus Football Association.

In 2015, Luz signed for Hapoel Jerusalem in Israel before joining Maccabi Ahi Nazareth.

In 2017, he signed for Romanian outfit CS Luceafărul Oradea.

In 2018, Luz signed for Polish second division side Radomiak Radom, where he claimed the quality was higher than in England, before sealing a move to Partizán Bardejov in the Slovakian second division.

References

External links
 Bruno Luz at Soccerway

Portuguese footballers
Living people
Association football wingers
Association football midfielders
1988 births
Hapoel Jerusalem F.C. players
CS Luceafărul Oradea players
Radomiak Radom players
Expatriate footballers in Poland
Partizán Bardejov players
Maccabi Ahi Nazareth F.C. players